Euriphene glaucopis, the cobalt nymph, is a butterfly in the family Nymphalidae. It is found in southeastern Nigeria, Cameroon, Gabon, the Republic of the Congo, and the western part of the Democratic Republic of the Congo. Its habitat consists of forests.

References

Butterflies described in 1916
Euriphene
Butterflies of Africa